
Gmina Jastrząb is a rural gmina (administrative district) in Szydłowiec County, Masovian Voivodeship, in east-central Poland.

Villages
Gmina Jastrząb contains the villages and settlements of Gąsawy Plebańskie, Gąsawy Rządowe, Gąsawy Rządowe-Niwy, Jastrząb, Kolonia Kuźnia, Kuźnia, Lipienice, Nowy Dwór, Orłów, Śmiłów, Wola Lipieniecka Duża and Wola Lipieniecka Mała.

Neighbouring gminas
Gmina Jastrząb is bordered by the gminas of Mirów, Orońsko, Szydłowiec, Wierzbica and Wolanów.

References
Polish official population figures 2006

Jastrzab
Szydłowiec County